Francisco Jesús "Fran" López de la Manzanara Delgado (born 12 September 1996) is a Spanish footballer who plays as either a central defender or a defensive midfielder for CD Numancia.

Club career
Born in La Solana, Ciudad Real, Castile-La Mancha, Manzanara was a Valencia CF youth graduate. In 2014 he joined Atlético Madrid, and made his senior debut with the C-team on 7 September 2014, starting in a 5–1 Tercera División home rout of AD Colmenar Viejo.

Manzanara scored his first senior goal on 2 November 2014, the equalizer in a 3–1 home win against CD Puerta Bonita. The following July, he was loaned to Segunda División B side FC Jumilla for the season.

On 25 July 2016, Manzanara moved to another reserve team, Atlético Levante UD in the third division. On 16 July 2018, after achieving promotion back to the Tercera División, he renewed his contract with the club.

Manzanara made his first team – and La Liga – debut on 24 November 2018, coming on as a late substitute for Sanjin Prcić in a 2–2 away draw against SD Huesca. The following 1 September, he moved to Segunda División side SD Ponferradina on a one-year loan deal.

Manzanara scored his first professional goal on 22 December 2019, netting his team's second in a 3–2 away win against UD Almería. The following 2 October, he terminated his contract with Levante.

Career statistics

Club

References

External links

1996 births
Living people
People from Ciudad Real
Sportspeople from the Province of Ciudad Real
Spanish footballers
Footballers from Castilla–La Mancha
Association football defenders
La Liga players
Segunda División players
Segunda División B players
Tercera División players
Atlético Madrid C players
FC Jumilla players
Atlético Levante UD players
Levante UD footballers
SD Ponferradina players
CD Numancia players